The Force is the ninth studio album by the funk band Kool & the Gang, released in 1977. 

The album peaked at No. 142 on the Billboard 200.

Critical reception
The Globe and Mail wrote that "it's strange that to this day, black soul musicians are trying to say it better than Sly [Stone] did a decade ago and failing miserably." The Bay State Banner wrote that the album "lacked the excellent jive vocals, hot horn lines and boogie beat arrangements Kool made famous."

Track listing

Personnel
 Ronald Bell – vocals, keyboards, clavinet, ARP synthesizer, percussion, alto saxophone, soprano saxophone, tenor saxophone, alto flute 
 Kevin Lassiter – vocals, keyboards, clavinet, Minimoog, percussion 
 George Brown – vocals, keyboards, clavinet, drums, percussion 
 Dennis Thomas – vocals, keyboards, congas, percussion, alto saxophone
 Claydes Smith – vocals, acoustic guitar, electric guitar, percussion
 Robert "Kool" Bell – vocals, bass guitar, percussion
 Otha Nash – vocals, valve and slide trombones, tuba, percussion
 Robert Mickens – vocals, trumpet, flugelhorn, percussion

 Additional Personnel 
 Jimmy J. Jordan – special effects 
 Donald Boyce – voice (1, 4)
 Cynthia Huggins – lead vocals (6)
 Female vocals – Renee Connel, Cynthia Huggins, Joan Motley and Beverly Owens
 Arthur Capehart – trumpet (7)
 Strings on 6 & 7 – MFSB; arranged by John Davis

Production
 Producer – K&G Productions
 Arrangements – Kool and The Gang
 Co-Producer – George Brown
 Executive Producers – Ronald Bell and Claydes Smith
 Engineers – Terry Rosiello and Nils Salminen
 Mixing – Ronald Bell, Terry Rosiello and Nils Salminen.
 Recorded at De-Lite Recorded Sound Studio (Philadelphia, PA).
 Mastered at Sterling Sound (New York, NY).
 Cover Painting – DeEs Schwertberger

References

External links

Kool & the Gang albums
1977 albums
De-Lite Records albums